Moontype is an American indie rock band from Chicago, Illinois. The group originally consisted of just vocalist Margaret McCarthy as a solo project while attending Oberlin College, but later expanded into a full band with guitarist Ben Cruz and drummer Emerson Hunton. As a solo project, McCarthy released her first EP under the Moontype alias titled Fan Music. The band released their debut full-length album, Bodies of Water, in 2021 on Born Yesterday Records.

Discography
Studio albums
Bodies of Water (2021, Born Yesterday Records)
EPs
Fan Music (2017, self-released)

References

Indie rock musical groups from Illinois
Musical groups from Chicago